Twenty Minutes of Love is a 1914 American comedy silent film made by Keystone Studios. The film is widely reported as Charlie Chaplin's directorial debut; some sources name Joseph Maddern as the director, but generally credit Chaplin as the creative force.

Reviews
The reviewer for Bioscope wrote, "Here Chaplin plays the role of the undesired but persistent suitor. The comic element is given special prominence and is quite safe in the hands of this well known comedian."

A reviewer from Kinematograph Weekly wrote, "Plenty of the comic element is introduced and the person who does not laugh at the peculiar antics of Chas. Chaplin--well, must be hard to please."

Cast
Charles Chaplin – Pickpocket
Minta Durfee – Woman
Edgar Kennedy – Lover
Gordon Griffith – Boy
Chester Conklin – Pickpocket
Josef Swickard – Victim
Hank Mann – Sleeper
Eva Nelson

See also
Charlie Chaplin filmography

References

External links
 
 

1910s English-language films
1914 films
1914 comedy films
1914 short films
Silent American comedy films
American silent short films
American black-and-white films
1914 directorial debut films
Short films directed by Charlie Chaplin
Films produced by Mack Sennett
Keystone Studios films
Articles containing video clips
American comedy short films
1910s American films